Herbert is one of the collection of grape varieties known as Rogers' Hybrids, created by E.S. Rogers in the mid-19th century, and is the result of a cross of Carter, a selection of Vitis labrusca, and Black Hamburg (there are two varieties known by this name, but in this case it was probably Schiava Grossa), a selection of Vitis vinifera. It was originally known as Rogers No. 44.

Herbert is female, and thus requires a second grape variety as a pollen source. Even then, Herbert tends towards straggly, poorly filled clusters. The black fruit ripens with Concord and keeps well. Although never extensively cultivated, it was a favorite of amateurs in the late 19th century and early 20th century. Hedrick considered the quality, at its best, to rival that of its vinifera parent.

References

Hybrid grape varieties